Vadivel Nimalarajah is a minority Sri Lankan Tamil proof reader for the newspaper Uthayan in Jaffna. He has been missing after being abducted on November 17, 2007, after working overnight in the  Uthayan newspaper office. Uthayan has been specifically targeted for its independent reporting by the Sri Lankan military and the paramilitary group EPDP.International Federation of Journalists lists his case in its campaign "Without a Trace" amongst the top 10 cases of  enforced disappearances of media workers which still remains untraced in Asia Pacific.

Background
Nimalarajah lived in Kachcheari-Nalloor road in Jaffna which is about 2 kilometers from the Uthayan office.He was 31 years old and unmarried. This incident is part of acts of violence and intimidation against journalists and human rights activists taking place in areas controlled by the Sri Lankan government. Vadivel Nimalarajah was abducted by a paramilitary allied with the Sri Lankan Army  earlier two journalists of Uthayan were killed after a cartoon mocking Douglas Devananda. His disappearance is  part of a series of  disappearances of Tamils in Jaffna which is under Army control.

Incident and reaction
Vadivel Nimalarajah disappeared on November 17, 2007, after working overnight in the  Uthayan newspaper office in what is termed as an enforced disappearance by human rights groups. A journalist working for Agence France-Presse describing the situation in Jaffna as terrible said

References

External links
Sri Lanka Journalists attacked Killed
UNHCR Report
Sad saga of post Rajapakse media freedom 

Possibly living people

Year of birth missing
Sri Lankan Hindus
Sri Lankan Tamil journalists
2000s missing person cases
Enforced disappearances in Sri Lanka
Missing person cases in Sri Lanka